San Carlos de Río Negro is a town in Venezuela's Amazonas State.

San Carlos de Río Negro is a small city of about 1200 inhabitants in the Venezuelan state of Amazonas. It serves as the administrative capital of the municipal district of Río Negro, inhabited primarily by Amerindian people, in particular the Yanomami and Baniwa (Kurripako) peoples. It sits on the opposite side of the Rio Negro from the Colombian city of San Felipe.

History 

The city of San Carlos de Río Negro was founded in 1759 as a camp set up by the expedition captained by José Solano y Bote. The expedition moved into the area to explore the extent of the limits of exploration as defined by the Treaty of Madrid between the Crowns of Portugal and Spain. José Solano y Bote set up his exploration base there on the banks of the Rio Negro with the few men that had survived the trek up the Orinoco River. Most of the men that accompanied the expedition, including the famous Swedish botanist Pehr Löfling, succumbed to tropical diseases, especially yellow fever.

In May 1800, the explorers Alexander von Humboldt and Aimé Bonpland visited the town, constituting the southernmost point of their expedition of the Amazon Basin.

Geography 
Within the city is a rocky formation called Piedra del Cocuy, an excellent climbing place in one of the most bio-diverse areas on Earth.

Travel 
Because of its remote location, there are few ways to get into and out of the city. There is only one small road that connect the city to the small fluvial port in the nearby town of Solano, located on the banks of the Casiquiare. The city can also be reached by air taxis and private plane.

Climate 

External links
Tourist information
Information on the Venezuelan state of Amazon
Tourist information

Populated places in Amazonas (Venezuelan state)
Populated places on the Rio Negro (Amazon)
Populated places established in 1759
1750s establishments in the Viceroyalty of New Granada
1759 establishments in South America